Miletus is a genus of butterflies sometimes called brownies. Its species are found in the eastern Palearctic realm and the Indomalayan realm, and some stray east of the Wallace Line. The genus was erected  by Jacob Hübner around 1819. Miletus is the type genus of the subfamily Miletinae.

Species
boisduvali species group
Miletus biggsii (Distant, 1884)
Miletus boisduvali Moore, 1857
Miletus cellarius (Fruhstorfer, 1913)
Miletus drucei (Semper, 1888)
chinensis species group
Miletus bannanus Huang & Xue, 2004
Miletus chinensis C. Felder, 1862
Miletus croton (Doherty, 1889)
Miletus gaesa (de Nicéville, 1895)
Miletus mallus (Fruhstorfer, 1913)
Miletus nymphis (Fruhstorfer, 1913)
melanion species group
Miletus bazilanus (Fruhstorfer, 1913)
Miletus melanion C. Felder & R. Felder, 1865
symethus species group
Miletus ancon Doherty, 1889
Miletus archilocus Fruhstorfer, 1913
Miletus atimonicus Murayama & Okamura, 1973
Miletus celinus Eliot, 1961
Miletus gallus (de Nicéville, 1894)
Miletus gigantes (de Nicéville, 1894)
Miletus heracleion (Doherty, 1891)
Miletus leos (Guérin-Ménéville, 1830)
Miletus rosei Cassidy, 1995
Miletus symethus (Cramer, [1777])
Miletus takanamii Eliot, 1986
zinckenii species group
Miletus gaetulus (de Nicéville, 1894)
Miletus gopara (de Nicéville, 1890)
Miletus valeus (Fruhstorfer, 1913)
Miletus zinckenii C. Felder & R. Felder, 1865

References

Boisduval, J. B. (1836). In Roret, Suite à Buffon, Histoire naturelle des Insectes. Species général des Lépidoptères 1: xii + 690pp., 24 pls. Paris.
Cassidy, A. C. (1995). "On the Miletini (Lepidoptera, Lycaenidae) of the Sulawesi Region". Transactions of the Lepidopterological Society of Japan . 46: 1–12.
Cramer, P. (1775–1780). De Uitlandsche Kapellen ... Asia, Africa en America ... Amsterdam, Baalde & Utrecht, 4 vols.
Eliot, J. N. (1961). "An analysis of the genus Miletus Hübner (Lepidoptera: Lycaenidae)". Bulletin of the Raffles Museum. 26: 154–177, 24 figs.
Eliot, J. N. (1986). "A review of the Miletini (Lepidoptera: Lycaenidae)". Bulletin of the British Museum (Natural History) (Entomology). 53 (1): 1–105.
Fruhstorfer, H. (1909–1923). In Seitz, A. Die Gross-Schmetterlinge der Erde. 9. Stuttgart.
Hübner, J. (1816–1826).  Verzeichniss bekannter Schmettlinge. Augsberg.
Horsfield, T. (1828–1829). A Descriptive Catalogue of the Lepidopterous Insects in the Museum of the Honourable East India Company. 144 pp., 8 pls. London.

External links

 With images.

 
Miletinae
Lycaenidae genera
Taxa named by Jacob Hübner